Gibbula capensis is a species of sea snail, a marine gastropod mollusk in the family Trochidae, the top snails.

Description
The size of the shell varies between 10 mm and 14 mm. The narrowly umbilicated shell has a conoid-depressed shape with 5 whorls. The first whorl is roseate, eroded, the following convex above, depressed beneath, whitish or rosy, flammulated with brownish-violet radiating maculations, obliquely striate and spirally lirate. The lirae are flat, narrow and not granose. The body whorl is dilated, subangulate above, depresso-carinated at the periphery, convex beneath and ornamented with 9 concentric reddish lirae. The aperture is oblique and subquadrate. The lip is simple. The columella is arcuate, denticulate at base, slightly calloused above, almost covering the umbilicus.

Distribution
This marine species occurs off the Western Cape, and Saldanha Bay to Cape Agulhas, Rep. South Africa

References

 Kilburn, R.N. & Rippey, E. (1982) Sea Shells of Southern Africa. Macmillan South Africa, Johannesburg, xi + 249 pp. page(s): 40

capensis
Gastropods described in 1791